Christianity is the largest religion in Venezuela, with Roman Catholicism having the most adherents.

The influence of the Catholic Church was introduced in its colonization by Spain. According to a 2011 poll (GIS XXI), 88 percent of the population is Christian, primarily Roman Catholic (71%), and the remaining 17 percent Protestant, primarily Evangelicals (in Latin America Protestants are usually called Evangelicos). The Venezuelans without religion are 8% (atheist 2% and agnostic or indifferent 6%), almost 3% of the population follow other religion (1% of them are of santeria).

There are small but influential Muslim, Druze, Buddhist, and Jewish communities. The Muslim community of about 95,000 is concentrated among persons of Lebanese and Syrian descent living in Nueva Esparta State, Punto Fijo and the Caracas area; Venezuela is home of the largest Druze communities outside the Middle East, and has a significant Druze community (60,000) from the same countries (a former vice president is Druze, showing the small group's influence). Buddhism in Venezuela is practiced by over 52,000 people. The Buddhist community is made up mainly of Chinese, Japanese, and Koreans. There are Buddhist centers in Caracas, Maracay, Mérida, Puerto Ordáz, San Felipe, and Valencia. The Jewish community numbers approximately 13,000 and is mainly concentrated in Caracas.

The Church of Jesus Christ of Latter-day Saints (Mormons) claims 173,125 members (April 2022) mostly in and around Caracas.

Jehovah's Witnesses claim 136,542 active publishers, united in 1,734 congregations; 319,962 people attended annual celebration of Lord's Evening Meal in 2020.

Venezuela is also notable for its significant syncretic religious traditions, most notably those revolving around the figures of Maria Lionza and Jose Gregorio Hernandez.

In Venezuela, a population of Santeria followers has been growing since 2008. Rituals in Santeria include the slaughtering of a rooster, a chicken, or a goat.

Religious freedom
The constitution of Venezuela provides for the freedom of religion insofar as it does not violate "public morality or decency". A 2017 constitutional law criminalizes "incitement to hatred" or violence, including provisions specifically concerning the incitement of hatred against religious groups.

Religious organizations must register with the government in order to obtain legal status. The Directorate of Justice and Religion, part of the Ministry of Interior, Justice and Peace, manages registrations, disburses funds to registered organizations, and promotes religious tolerance. Chaplain services in the military are available only for Catholics.

Religious education is allowed in public schools, although it is not part of any official curriculum proposed by the government. Representatives of the Catholic Church-affiliated National Laity Council have claimed that the government has at times pressured school administrators to not teach religious courses, but that in other cases teachers had autonomy to include religious education as long as their curricula were otherwise compliant with the Ministry of Education's standards.

Leaders of religious organizations who are vocal critics of the government faced harassment by pro-government groups who accused them of improperly politicizing their religious services. In some cases this harassment has escalated to violence. Jewish community leaders have accused state-funded media and some government officials of engaging in antisemitic rhetoric.

Catholic Church in Venezuela
The Catholic Church in Venezuela has around 31 million faithful, which represents 98% of the population. There are 37 jurisdictions present including 25 dioceses, 9 archdioceses, 3 vicariates apostolic, plus separate jurisdictions for the Melkite and Syrian rites, and also a military ordenate.

The Catholic manifestations in Venezuela are very varied, which means that in many regions they venerate a Marian dedication or a specific saint, as well as the realization of various fairs, masses, processions and parties for each patron saint of Catholicism. In this way, for example, in Zulia the Chinita Fair is celebrated, in Nueva Esparta the Virgen del Valle is celebrated and in Lara, the Divina Pastora is celebrated.

Protestant Churches in Venezuela

Protestantism is a branch of Christianity that has its origins in the reform initiated by Martin Luther and other theologians as a critical response to the Catholic Church at the time. In general, Protestantism in Latin America has constituted, since the beginning of the Spanish conquest and colonization of America, a very minority sector of the Christian population that has been growing exponentially every decade. Protestantism was successful in several European nations, becoming predominant in the Scandinavian countries and in Northern Germany. In the following decades, various theological currents allowed the birth of various denominations, such as: Presbyterianism (which in turn became the official religion of Scotland, as the State Church de Kirk), Calvinism, Anabaptism in Switzerland and The Netherlands, Methodism in England, among others.

Motivated by poverty and in search of a better future, hundreds of thousands of northwestern Europeans saw their destiny in the United States of America and made it their new home, where they practiced the Protestant faith from different perspectives. The nation did not have a single national language officially, which allowed each church to celebrate its religious services in the languages of their countries of origin. That's why the existence of free evangelical (state) churches, regardless of denomination, with Swedish and Norwegian-Danish backgrounds, in addition of the  German, Dutch and also English-speaking ones. All this was seen in the revivals known as: First Great Awakening, Second Great Awakening, Third Great Awakening and Fourth Great Awakening; being the Third Great Awakening the seedbed for the expansion of Protestantism towards Latin America and the Caribbean countries, and in the other continents.

In Venezuela, the increase in numbers began at the end of the 19th century after a series of religious openings. Prior to 1830, English-speaking Quakers were present in the capital city.  So that, Protestantism has gradually become the second largest Christian community in the country after Catholicism. In this sense, according to the Evangelical Council of Venezuela, 20% of the population of Venezuela is evangelical protestant. This is the result of several missionary efforts done across the country with foreign and national believers. One of the first protestant churches built in Caracas was the Lutheran Church serving especially to the German speaking community living in Caracas. Then, the first denomination established to new believers in the nation was the Presbyterianism. "El Redentor" Presbyterian Evangelical Church is named as the oldest congregation of Caracas dating back to 1898, which merged from a earlier methodist effort since 1878. The evangelicals have had a big motivation for establishing schooling with Christian belief emphasis, just like the Christiansen Academy, in Rubio, Venezuela; as well as Colegio Americano de Caracas (Presbyterian).

The spread of evangelical proselytizing was be organized into different regions by diverse pioneer works:

The Christian-Evangelical Churches of Venezuela, today, are mainly segmented into six major branches:

Other Evangelical Christian Denominations across the country
 Evangelical Foursquare Church
 Methodist Groups like: Free Methodist Church, and the United Methodist Church
 Wesleyan Church
 Evangelical Mennonites
 Church of God (Pentecostal)
 Church of God of Prophecy
 Church of the Nazarene (Holiness movement)
 Church of God Ministry of Jesus Christ International (Neopentecostal)
 Church of Christ
 Christ Apostolic Church

Eastern Orthodox Church in Venezuela 

The Orthodox Church in Venezuela has existed in Venezuela with the purpose of satisfying the spiritual needs of this religious groups, mainly made up of Russian, Yugoslav (Serbian, Croat and Bosnian) immigrants who arrived in the country since the end of World War II. It does not obey a planned system of religious proselytism, since church services were held in the immigrants' languages. Added to that group are the Greeks, Romanians, and Ukrainians, who with the passing of the decades their descendants have maintained that faith in the country.

See also 
 Catholic Church in Venezuela
 Islam in Venezuela

References